Augustini may refer to:

 Augustine of Hippo (354–430), Christian theologian
 Jan Augustini (1725–1773), Dutch painter
 Oliver Augustini (born 1990), Slovak football player